Primula aureata is a species of flowering plant from the family Primulaceae.

Description 
Primula aureata is a perennial plant growing up to 5cm tall. The leaves are broad with rounded tips, they form a rosette around the base of the plant. They are also irregularly toothed to give a sharp appearance. Leaves are coated in a silvery white farina. Flowers are white around the rim and yellow towards the centre. Each petal is also toothed. 

Primula aureata also has a subspecies known as Primula aureata fimbriata, which possess much smaller flowers.

Distribution 
This species is native to Nepal and East Himalaya. In Nepal it can be found growing in both Langtang and Gosainkund.

Habitat 
Primula aureata grows in rocky habitats, on steep, sometimes vertical mountain faces at altitudes between 3600 and 4300m.

It can also be found living nearby to water sources such as rivers and lakes. It can even occasionally be found growing under waterfalls.

References 

aureata